Ntamack is a surname. Notable people with the surname include:

Émile Ntamack (born 1970), French rugby union player, brother of Francis and father of Romain
Francis Ntamack (born 1972), French rugby union player
Romain Ntamack (born 1999), French rugby union player